[[File:Mexico Governors Map.svg|thumb|right|390px|

The United Mexican States, commonly known as Mexico, is a federation comprising thirty-two States. The Head of Government of Mexico City is not considered a governorship, but the position is included on this list of governors for the sake of completeness. Article 109 of the current Federal Constitution states that for their internal government, the States shall adopt the popular, representative, republican form of government, with the free Municipality as the basis of their territorial division and political and administrative organization. The election of governors of the States and the local legislatures shall be direct and in the manner prescribed by their respective electoral laws.

State governors serve six-year terms and, like the President of Mexico, they are barred from seeking reelection. No one who has previously held a governorship may run for or serve in the post again, even on a caretaker basis. Candidates for governor must be Mexican citizens by birth and either a native of the state or a resident of the state for at least five years prior to election day, per article 116 part I of the Mexican constitution.

Including the Head of Government of Mexico City, 3 governorships are held by the Institutional Revolutionary Party, 5 are members of the National Action Party, 20 are members of the National Regeneration Movement, 1 is a member of the Social Encounter Party, 2 are members of the Citizens' Movement and 1 is from the Ecologist Green Party of Mexico.

State Governors

See also

 List of Mexican state congresses
 National Governors Conference (Mexico)

References

External links
 State Governors of Mexico
 Elections upcoming and most recent.

 
Mexican governors
Governors